Darvishabad (also Romanized as Darvīshābād) is a village in Rizab Rural District, Qatruyeh District, Neyriz County, Fars Province, Iran. At the 2006 census, its population was 80, in 17 families.

References 

Populated places in Neyriz County